The 2018–19 season is Alloa Athletic's first season back in the Scottish Championship. They also competed in the Challenge Cup, League Cup and the Scottish Cup.

Competitions

Scottish Championship

League table

Matches

Scottish League Cup

Group stage

Matches

Scottish Challenge Cup

Scottish Cup

Squad statistics

Appearances

|}

References

Alloa Athletic F.C. seasons
Alloa